USS Farquhar may refer to the following ships operated by the United States Navy:

  was a destroyer, commissioned in 1920 and decommissioned in 1930.
  was a destroyer escort, commissioned in 1943 and decommissioned in 1946.

United States Navy ship names